Ro's Torv is a shopping centre in central Roskilde, Denmark.

History
Designed by Claus B. Hansen and built by the Keops property company, Ro's Torv was inaugurated in 2003. In 2006 Keops bought out Hansen and commenced an expansion before selling it to Essex Invest. In 2008, Ro's Torv was sold to DADES for DKK 1.5 billion. The expansion was designed by AK83 Arkitekter while Keops was responsible for the construction.

Facilities
Ro's Torv contains 60 shops and nine eateries. Other facilities include a cinema (Kino Ro's Torv) and a Fitness.dk fitness centre.

See also
 Roskilde Congress & Sports Centre

References

Roskilde
Shopping centres in Denmark
2003 establishments in Denmark